The 1912 Adrian Bulldogs football team represented Adrian College during the 1912 college football season.

Schedule

References

Adrian
Adrian Bulldogs football seasons
Adrian Bulldogs football